The Australian Air League (AAL) is a not-for-profit, civilian operated aviation youth organisation in Australia. Its objective is to encourage the spirit of aviation and air-mindedness in the youth of Australia. The Australian Air League receives no money or assistance of any government department and is entirely self-funded. Its Latin motto is A Vinculo Terrae (Free From the Bonds of The Earth). The official patron of the Australian Air League is aviation journalist Jeff Watson.

History 

Mr. George Robey was an Australian soldier who distinguished himself as an original ANZAC. He was awarded a Distinguished Conduct Medal on 25 April 1915 at the Gallipoli landing. Mr. Robey was still a soldier, in the Citizen Military Forces when in 1927 he went to Canberra to assist in the Ceremonial Opening of Parliament House.

He brought back a toy wooden aeroplane for his son Keith that sparked an interest in aviation that inspired his son and that inspiration has lasted until the present day.

Keith Robey through his career has been a senior executive of one of Australia's largest general aviation companies. Keith has also been known as a well-respected aviation feature writer for Aircraft magazine, specialising in flight testing of aircraft.

The gift of the toy wooden aeroplane also sparked off the Australian Air League when five years later Keith complained of the lack of a youth organisation specialising in aviation.

His father George Robey and other concerned adults formed the Air Mindedness Development League and on 18 July 1934 Keith became enrolled as the first Cadet member. Not long after that the name was changed to the Australian Air League.

The first training Squadron opened at Manly, New South Wales on 17 January 1935 with 30 Cadets aged between 14 and 23 years. The first girls Squadron opened in 1944. The Correspondence Wing commenced in 1941. By 1942, 26,000 boys had been trained in aviation and 125 Squadrons operated in three states.

World War II took its toll as many of the Officers went into the services and at the end of hostilities, felt that they had experienced more than enough of wearing uniforms and discipline and hence many Squadrons closed.

However, the Australian Air League has continued. There are around 76 active Squadrons and more squadrons continue to open. The founders of the Australian Air League saw the prosperous future for aviation and the Australian Air League has become part of that future being recognised in the aviation industry and Armed Services as the primary school of aviation. Over the years it has been held in high respect by the leaders of the Nation and from early stages of our history, Governors General of Australia have been Patron-In-Chief of the Australian Air League.

On 21 April 2009, the Civil Aviation Safety Authority granted the Australian Air League official use of the Australian Civil Aviation Ensign to recognise the organisation's significant contribution to aviation in Australia. The Australian Air League paraded and flew the flag at the organisation's 75th Anniversary Review in Sydney on 26 September 2009. It is the first time the honour of flying the flag has ever been granted to any other organisation outside of the Civil Aviation Safety Authority's jurisdiction.

Today the Australian Air League Inc. is an independent organisation and is not associated with, or sponsored by, any religious, military or other organisation. It is completely self-governing and self-supporting.

Volunteer Support 
As a not for profit organisation, the Australian Air League relies on the help of a network of volunteers to carry out the various tasks which need to be fulfilled in order for the organisation to exist.

Coming from a wide range of backgrounds, these volunteers bring a variety of different skills to the League and contribute as either an associate or League member, from where then can play a vital role in the operation of various levels of the league.

Associate Membership 
Associate membership provides a way for adults to join as non-uniformed, but financial, members of the League. Associate members are eligible to serve on the Squadron 'Branch Committee' from where they can directly assist the squadron by helping to keep track of the Squadrons finances and co-ordinating fund-raising activities.

Associate members are also eligible to participate in most functions and activities that are open to uniformed members.

League Membership 
Alternatively an adult may wish to join the League as an Officer. Such people are inducted into the League's Officer Training Programme, where they are given the rank of Warrant Officer and taken through a series of courses covering the day-to-day operations of a squadron, the expectations they will face, and correct procedure for handling different situations.

Upon completing the course the new member is awarded the rank of Second Officer, given an appointment and is attached to a unit, usually the squadron in their local area.

Ranks and Appointments
The Australian Air League has an internal rank structure for all uniformed members which is replicated from various organisations including military forces, police forces and Commercial aviation organisations. For Officers, there are also appointments, a position in a unit which encompass tasks that the Officer undertakes . Officer rank in the Australian Air League relates to the level of an Officers senior appointment (if they have more than one). 

The ranks are divided into three categories. The first are the Cadet ranks (referred to as N.C.O. ranks). These ranks are awarded to members of a Squadron, aged under 18 years, who have displayed, amongst other things, excellent leadership abilities, discipline and determination. These promotions are recommended by the Officer Commanding Squadron. The candidate for promotion must complete a variety of tasks in order to prove their suitability for the position, such as passing oral and written examinations.

In the second category there are supernumery ranks. These are ranks held by members who do not fit into the Officer or Cadet ranking system. Ranks in this category are held by uniformed adult members.

In the third category are the Officer ranks. These are ranks awarded to uniformed adult members of the League based upon their performance and appointment within their respective unit. These promotions are recommended by the officer's immediate superior.

The ranks an individual member holds is signified by:

 A series of chevrons worn on both sleeves for N.C.O. ranks 
 A sky blue AAL Logo for Warrant Officers 
 A series of silver or gold stripes worn on the epaulettes for Officer ranks. 
 An absence of any rank insignia indicates a rank of "Cadet".

Chart of Cadet (N.C.O.) ranks 
The ranks in this chart are listed with each successive rank down the page being superior to the one preceding it.

Chart of Supernumery ranks 
The ranks in this chart are listed with each successive rank down the page being superior to the one preceding it.

Chart of Officer ranks 
The ranks in this chart are listed with each successive rank down the page being superior to the one preceding it.

Chart of Appointment levels 
This table doesn't include all appointments available within the AAL, but describes what insignia is available for their appointment.

Structure of the League

Cadet 
The term "Cadet" refers to a member who is under the age of 18 and/or holds one of the NCO ranks.
Upon turning the age of 16 a Cadet becomes a Senior Cadet and wears dark blue epaulettes.

Section 

A Section is defined as a group of five Cadets, three of whom may be Leading Cadets, with a Corporal in charge of the Section for a total of six members. If the Section contains all three Leading Cadets, they comprise the first three members on the Corporal's left when forming up.

Flight 

A Flight consists of 3 Sections in formation under the command of a Sergeant, making a total of 19 members.

When assembled as a Flight, each horizontal line of 6 cadets is known as a "rank". The 3 "ranks" are referred to as 'A', 'B' and 'C' sections, with 'A' section forming the front rank, 'B' section in the middle rank, and 'C' section at the rear. Each vertical line of cadets is known as a file. Each file is associated a number. (1 through 6 numbered from Sergeant's left)

Flag Party 
A Flag Party is ceremonial unit paraded by Squadrons, Wings, Groups and Federal. Within a Squadron it can take 2 forms:
1 - 1 NCO in Charge, 3 bearers and 3 escorts;
2 - 1 NCO in Charge, 1 bearer and 2 escorts.

The first version consists of three flags, the State, National and Squadron flag. The second version may only consist of the Squadron or unit flag.

Wing, Group and Federal Flag Parties may only take the second form using their respective flag.

The ranks of the members in a Squadron Flag party must satisfy the following criteria:
 The N.C.O. in charge may hold a rank of no higher than Sergeant, but must out-rank every other member of the Flag Party.
 The flag-bearers are charged with the duty of carrying the Squadron, State and National flags. These members may hold a rank no higher than Corporal, but must equal or outrank the escorts.
 The escorts role is to assist the flag bearer and to "escort" the flags. These members may hold a rank no higher than Leading Cadet, but be of equal or lesser rank than the flag bearers

Band 
Several Squadrons, Wings and Groups throughout the Australian Air League also have marching bands, made up of Cadets and Officers with an NCO in charge who is the Drum Major. The Drum Major is equivalent in rank to a Sergeant, although whilst in the band they are in charge of all personnel, including Officers.

Air League bands are typically composed of either a Drum Corps, or a Drum & Bugle Corps and can vary in size from 9 personnel up to a full band of 24 personnel. Air League bands compete in competitions as well as provide music during parades, both for the Air League as well as outside events such as ANZAC Day, Reserve Forces Day, Community Festivals and other promotional work for the Air League.

Squadron 
A full Squadron consists of any number of Flights and a Flag Party with a Squadron Sergeant being in charge of all the cadet members present. Rather than directly ordering each unit, the Squadron Sergeant conveys orders to the N.C.O.s in charge of each sub-unit, who then relay the orders to their subordinates.

The Squadron also has a number of non-command Officers who are referred to as the Squadron Staff. The command level officer of the Squadron is the "Officer Commanding Squadron", usually abbreviated to S.O.C., or just O.C. when used in a Squadron environment.

A list of operating Squadrons can be viewed at the Air League National Website

Wing 
A Wing consists of at least 2 Squadrons, who usually share a common geographical location. Similar to a Squadron, non-command Officers who work within the Wing are referred to as Wing Staff. The command level officer of this unit is the "Officer Commanding Wing" who is responsible for ensuring all Squadrons are operating efficiently.

Region 
A region consists of at least 2 wings which usually share a larger geographical area. For example, "Eastern Region".

Group 
A Group coordinates the League's activities at a State level and consists of all the Squadrons and Wings in their particular state. Group Status is defined by the League's Chief Commissioner, according to set criteria. Units in states that do not conform to these criteria are designated Wings of the Federal Unit. The commanding officer of this unit is the "Group Executive Commissioner" who is responsible for the operations of their respective Group. Non-command Officers who are in the Group are referred to as Group staff.

At present, the following groups currently exist within the League:
 Victoria Group
 Queensland Group
 N.S.W. Group
 South Australia Group

Federal
Federal Staff are responsible for ensuring the day-to-day running of their appointments and ensuring that all Groups (or Wings if the state have yet to be given 'Group' status) are operating efficiently and to the aims and objects of the League. The commanding officer of this unit is the "Chief Commissioner" who is the senior Officer of the League.

Reviews
The Australian Air League holds Reviews on several levels of Units, ranging from Wing Reviews, Group Reviews and Australian Air League Reviews. Group Reviews are usually held annually and Australian Air League Reviews are usually held every 2–3 years. Reviews are held in order to maintain a sense of healthy competition between Groups, Wings and Squadrons. The basic function of a Review is to investigate the standard of ceremonial drill in the Air League. The latest Australian Air League Review was held in 2018 at Sydney, New South Wales. The review that was meant to be held in 2020 in Queensland was postponed to be held at a later date due to the COVID-19 pandemic.

Activities 
Australian Air League members participate and compete in several activities including Camping, Ceremonial Drill, Model Aircraft Building and Flying, Sports and the Duke of Edinburgh's Award. Several members have achieved and have been awarded with their Gold Duke of Edinburgh. Community Service is a major part of an Australian Air League members life. They volunteer for events like the NSW Premier's Senior Citizens Concert, the Red Shield Appeal for the Salvation Army and Clean Up Australia Day. They also participate in local festivals and ANZAC Day Parades.

Education classes have been provided for the benefit of members. They include (but not limited to):
 Aero Engines
 Electronics
 Meteorology
 Navigation
 Photography
 Radio and Radar
 Semaphore
 Spaceflight
 Theory of Flight
 Flight Attendant

Members also have the opportunity to complete the AAL General Diploma, the AAL Aviation Diploma, and the AAL Gold Diploma by obtaining the selected amount of education badges the courses prescribes within a particular time period.

Members can also commence flight training at the age of 14. The league operates a flying school from Camden Airport, south-west of Sydney with the NSW Air Activities Centre uniquely positioned as the only volunteer-run, not-for-profit Flight Training Organisation (FTO) and Charter (Air Transport - smaller aeroplane) Operator in Oceania. The fleet of aircraft owned and operated by the Australian Air League includes:

 VH-SOX, Cessna 152 (pictured right)
 VH-PAT, Cessna 172 Skyhawk
 VH-LRA, Piper PA-28 Warrior

External links 
Official web site
Information on joining the AAL
Australian Air League - South Australia Wing

References 

Organizations established in 1934
Youth organisations based in Australia
Non-profit organisations based in Victoria (Australia)
Aviation in Australia